The Bornean clouded leopard (Neofelis diardi borneensis) is a subspecies of the Sunda clouded leopard. It is native to the island of Borneo, and differs from the Batu-Sumatran clouded leopard in the shape and frequency of spots, as well as in cranio-mandibular and dental characters. In 2017, the Cat Classification Taskforce of the Cat Specialist Group recognized the validity of this subspecies.

Habitat and distribution 
In Kalimantan, it was recorded in Sabangau National Park.

In Sabah, it was recorded in Danum Valley Conservation Area, Ulu Segama, Malua and Kabili-Sepilok Forest Reserves, Tabin Wildlife Reserve and the Lower Kinabatangan Wildlife Sanctuary.

Ecology 
Results of a camera-trapping survey revealed that it is largely nocturnal.

Evolution 
The Bornean clouded leopard is estimated to have diverged from the Sumatran clouded leopard in the Late Pleistocene, between 400 and 120 thousand years ago. Land bridges that were created due to low sea levels in the Late Pleistocene were submerged by rising sea levels, resulting in the Bornean clouded leopard becoming separated from the mainland population at this time. It was recognized as its own subspecies in 2007 following an analysis of the genetic substructure of the Bornean and Sumatran clouded leopards, which concluded that there was enough genetic variation to recognize the Sumatran Neofelis diardi diardi and the Bornean Neofelis diardi borneensis as two different subspecies.

Preservation & Threats 
Bornean cloud leopards are considered vulnerable, similar to other Neofelis species, due to anthropogenic disturbances such as deforestation, illegal poaching, and hunting pressure.

See also 
 Bay cat
 Bornean tiger
 Sunda Islands

References

External links 

Neofelis
Endemic fauna of Borneo
Mammals of Borneo
Carnivorans of Malaysia
Mammals of Indonesia
Vulnerable fauna of Asia